Lino Benech (born 15 October 1947) is a former Uruguayan cyclist. He competed in the team time trial at the 1972 Summer Olympics.

References

External links
 

1947 births
Living people
Uruguayan male cyclists
Olympic cyclists of Uruguay
Cyclists at the 1972 Summer Olympics
Place of birth missing (living people)